Rao Bahadur Conjeevaram Hayavadana Rao (10 July 1865 – 27 January 1946) was an Indian historian, museologist, anthropologist, economist and polyglot. He was a member of the Royal Anthropological Institute, Indian Historical Records Commission and a fellow of the Royal Society of Economics.

Early life 
Hayavadana Rao was born on 10 July 1865 in the town of Hosur in the then Salem district of Madras Presidency in a Kannada-speaking Deshastha Madhwa Brahmin family. After  graduating in history, Rao studied law and economics and joined the Government Museum, Madras as a curator. Rao worked as a curator till his retirement and compiled "The Indian Biographical Dictionary". Rao was a polyglot and was fluent in English, Latin, French, German, Kannada, Tamil, Telugu, Marathi and Sanskrit.

Mysore Kingdom 
In 1924, Rao was appointed the head of a committee formed to revise the Mysore Gazetteer written by B. L. Rice. The revised version comprising seven volumes was published in 1927. Rao followed this with a three-volume History of Mysore (1399-1799) chronicling the Wodeyar Dynasty.

Later life and death 
Rao died on 27 January 1946 in Bangalore.

Works

References and sources
References

Sources

 

1865 births
1946 deaths
People from Salem district
19th-century Indian historians
20th-century Indian historians
Indian museologists
Scientists from Tamil Nadu
Madhva Brahmins